Sandip Rai is a Nepali professional football defender, playing for Three Star Club in Martyr's Memorial A-Division League. He was also voted the Nepalese Footballer Of the Year 2013. He was banned due to match fixing.

Mohammedan Sporting Club
He signed for I-League 2nd Division side Mohammedan Sporting Club in Kolkota in 2010.

International

International goals

Match fixing allegations
On 14 October 2015 Rai, along with teammates Sagar Thapa, Bikash Singh Chhetri, Ritesh Thapa and former Three Star Club coach Anjan KC were arrested by the Nepal Police on suspicion that the group was responsible for match-fixing at the domestic and international level. On 19 October 2015 Rai and the four others were banned by the Asian Football Confederation.

References

1989 births
Living people
People from Lalitpur District, Nepal
Nepalese footballers
Nepal international footballers
Footballers at the 2014 Asian Games
Three Star Club players
Association football defenders
Sportspeople involved in betting scandals
Asian Games competitors for Nepal